Vestal McIntyre is an American author currently based in the UK. He was born in Nampa, Idaho, and educated at Tufts University, Massachusetts. His first collection of short stories, You Are Not the One, was published by the independent Scottish publisher Canongate in 2006. His follow-up book, Lake Overturn, was published in 2009, and won the GrubStreet National Book Prize and the Lambda Literary Award for Gay Fiction.

Bibliography

References

External links
Vestal McIntyre

21st-century American novelists
American male novelists
Living people
People from Nampa, Idaho
Novelists from Idaho
Lambda Literary Award for Gay Fiction winners
American gay writers
Tufts University alumni
American LGBT novelists
American male short story writers
21st-century American short story writers
21st-century American male writers
Lambda Literary Award for Debut Fiction winners
Year of birth missing (living people)